De Rucci Healthy Sleep Co. is a mattress company in China, headquartered in Dongguan, Guangdong.

Lin Jiyong and Wang Bingkun established the firm in 2004. Its first offices were in Dongguan. It had 4,200 shops in China in 2020, as well as various showcase facilities outside of China. Its sales figures that year were $690 million U.S. dollars. By 2022 it received media attention for using a man of European ancestry in its advertising as a mascot, in a reflection of what were face jobs. The man agreed to allow the company to use his face for perpetuity in 2009. In 2021 China Daily criticized the usage of his face to suggest a non-Chinese origin for the company. The author of the article, Zhang Zhouxiang, stated "But such blind worship is uncalled for in China now that it has become the world's second-largest economy." David Fickling of Bloomberg News argued that the usage of the man of European origin and European-inspired branding reflected an internalized inferiority felt in China, similar to that felt by people in Japan in the mid-20th century, before the rise of the Japanese economy.

References

External links
 De Rucci 
 De Rucci United States
 De Rucci Australia
Companies based in Dongguan
Retail companies of China
Mattresses